Joseph Paul Fok (born 24 September 1962) is a Permanent Judge of the Hong Kong Court of Final Appeal. At 51 years and 28 days, he is the third youngest-ever judge to be appointed to the Court of Final Appeal, behind only Kemal Bokhary and Andrew Li (Andrew Li was appointed directly to the Chief Justice position).

Early life
Fok is one of five children of Dr Alison Bell and Dr Peter Fok Hin-tak.

Fok obtained a Bachelor of Laws with honours from University College London in the United Kingdom in 1984.  He attended the Inns of Court School of Law and passed the Bar Examination in 1985. He was called to the English Bar in 1985 and to the Hong Kong Bar in 1986.

Legal career
Fok was in private practice in Hong Kong from January 1987, and on a part-time ad hoc basis in Singapore between March 2002 and March 2006.  He was appointed Senior Counsel in 1999. He was a member of Temple Chambers.

Judicial career
Fok was appointed a Recorder of the Court of First Instance of the High Court from 2003 to 2009.

On 1 July 2006, Fok was appointed a justice of the peace.

He joined the Judiciary as a Judge of the Court of First Instance of the High Court on 1 February 2010.  Fok was appointed a Justice of Appeal of the Court of Appeal of the High Court on 1 February 2011.

He was appointed a Permanent Judge of the Court of Final Appeal in 2013, replacing Mr Justice Patrick Chan.

On 25 September 2015, Fok was elected a Bencher of the Middle Temple.

References

Hong Kong judges
Hong Kong people of Scottish descent
1962 births
Living people